The Western Pilbara lined ctenotus (Ctenotus pallasotus)  is a species of skink found in Western Australia.

References

pallasotus
Reptiles described in 2017
Taxa named by Daniel L. Rabosky
Taxa named by Paul Doughty